Christ the King Church, Jog Falls was established in 1959. It is located in Jog Falls Sagara, Shimoga District Karnataka state India.

History 
 
 
Jog Falls the Tourist Centre of world fame, attracted visitors from all over the world, for its majestic beauty and natural scenery. As could be seen from the Visitors Books preserved in the Travellers Bungalow, both at Mysore and Siddapur side, Jog Falls was considered a place of Tourist importance from over one and half century. During the last century Europeans used to visit the Falls via Gersoppa, a small coastal village at the mouth of the Sharavathy River, about twelve miles from Honnavar Bunder, and they named the falls, as Gersoppa Falls, since there was no other village near by, which could be easily accessible. As such the name Jog Falls was only a local name, and the falls were known outside Mysore State by the name Gersoppa Falls. Jog Falls is by the river
Sharavathy, which takes its source at Ambuthirtha in Thirthahalli Taluk, in Shimoga District, is situated in the heart of the jungles, on the Western Ghats it is 66 miles from Shimoga the District headquarters and 21 miles from Sagar the Taluk headquarters. It is 237 miles North-west of Bangalore, and almost the same distance north of Mysore. The nearest Railway station is at Talaguppa, twelve miles from Jog.
The History of Jog PARISH can be traced as far back as the year 1937, when the  works for the Jog Hydro Electric Project was taken up. Prior to this, the area was almost a thick jungle,  infested by pythons, tigers and other wild animals, and it was also considered as a Hunters' Resort. There was only one building, the existing Inspection Bungalow, which was under Forest Department, (and this building was supposed to have been built somewhere in the middle of the nineteenth century), and no human habitation could be found within a radius of about two miles. The nearest village from the falls was Marathakeri, a small hamlet which existed near where the present Eswara Temple stands. Another small village was Kargal at a distance of three miles from Jog Falls. These villages were entirely shut up from the outer world, and once or twice a year these villagers used to go to Sagar for their necessities. The only approach to the falls from Sagar was via ferry, which is one and half mile from the falls. The distance to Sagar from Jog Falls via ferry is only 18 miles, even at the Travellers Bungalow there was no life, except during Tourist Season. i.e. from October to end of January. The Travellers Bungalow was in charge of onc Sri P.A. D'Souza. maity. who was living near the Ferry, and only when Visitors came he used to come to the T.B. to render them help and service. Near the Ferry there were eight Konkani Catholic families, who were living by agriculture and by ferry boating. The Ecclesiastical jurisdiction beyond ferry was then under Goa Diocese, until the Diocese of Karwar was created, and the jurisdiction came under the newly created Diocese.
When the survey work was taken up for the Jog Hydro Electric Project, little by little people from outside began to come and settle in Jog. Among the early settlers, mention may be made of Sri S.C.Fernandes, Forest Guard, Sri P A. D’Souza Maity, Mathews Gabral, Bejmi Mascarenhas and Joseph, a Malayali Catholic from Travancore. Sri S.C.Fernandes, was living near the ferry and cultivating some lands in the Sirur valley, on the site of the existing Sirur Reservoir. He came and settled near his lands somewhere in the year 1938. Sriyuths P.A.  D’Souza and Mathews Gabral, who were employed at the T.B. and living near the ferry, also came and settled near the Falls when the survey work was taken up. Sri Bejmi Mascarenhas was living with his family near the ferry cultivating lands. He along with some of the Catholic residents of the ferry, was the first to help the Officers who came to Jog for the survey works. Sri Bejmi came and settled in Jog with his family when the regular Project work commenced, and later on he was employed in the works. Sri Joseph came with his family and settled near the lands of Guard Fernandes, somewhere, here in the year 1940 and was running a small tea shop.

The survey work was completed during the year 1938, and the Inaugural Stone for the new project was laid by the late Highness, Sri Krishnarajendra Wadeyar, on 6 January 1939. From thence the regular Project works commenced, and formation of roads, construction of temporary and permanent buildings were taken up the Public Works Department. Labour was invited from all over the country and people of all nationalities began to pour into Jog in thousands. As there was much  scope for masonry and other skilled labour, many Konkani Catholic families from North Kanara District, began to come and settle in Jog. By the year 1944 there were about 100 Catholic families, among whom about five or six were Tamilians and the rest were Konkani.
The Parochial visits to Jog to cater to the spiritual needs of the Catholic workers, actually commenced from the year 1953, during the time of Rev. Father Raynaurd de Prigney, Parish Priest of Sagar. Father Prigney used to visit Jog once a month, visit the faithful in labour sheds, say mass in the T.B. or some vacant building. There were instances when he was refused any roofing accommodation, and he had to say Mass under the shelter of a tree. Among a few leading Catholics of the time, who were holding responsible jobs in the project, mention may be made of Sri J.P.David, Inspector of Mines and Explosives, Sri A. Rayappa and Sri V.A.D'Souza, Accountants in the P.W.D., and Robert Fernandes Compounder These were the only few who assisted the Priest during his parochial visits.

The year 1944 saw the dawn of Catholic atmosphere in Jog, when Sri John L.D'Sa came to Jog with his family during September 1944, as the Hydrauli Engineer and Penstock Erector. Mr & Mrs DSa took up the Catholic Action into their hands, and began to work for the formation of a Parish at Jog. In the year 1945, His Lordship, Rt. Rev Dr Rene Fuega, Bishop of Mysore, paid a visit to Jog, when he was given a grand civic reception. His Lordship was much impressed by the piety of the congregation, which by that time was about five hundred, and the enthusiasm evinced by the Catholic Leaders, and especially by D'Sa family, and gave his approval for the formation of a committee to look after the Church affairs, under the Presidency of Mr. D'Sa and guidance of the Parish Priest of Sagar. Rev. Fr. F. Lopes was then the Parish Priest, who used to visit jog once a month, and stay with Mr.DSa, and say Mass in his Bungalow. His Lordship also empowered the Committee to collect funds from the Catholic Members, for the Religious expenses. 
and maintain accounts, Mr. D’Sa was made the custodian of the Church money. A monthly subscription from four annas to eight annas was fixed for every earning member As approved by His Lordship. The collected money remained with the Committee. and the Committee had to pay Rs. 5/- to the Priest for every trip, plus his mess charges.

Efforts started from the year 1945 to raise funds for the construction of a suitable Church, for the spiritual benefits of the congregation. A small shed belonging to a contractor, was purchased for four hundred rupees. This shed was made of mud walls, and bamboo thatties and stood where the present Church stands. All we could get out of the shed, when it was dismantled after three years. were tiles only. Immediately the shed was purchased, the inner walls were removed, converting the whole into a hall, and an Altar was put up. This shed was blessed and opened by our beloved Bishop during the year 1946, and was dedicated to Christ the King, as the Patron of the Parish. A new Statue of Christ the King, donated by one Sri Shabi Furtado, was installed on the Main Altar  and the whole congregation was consecrated to Christ the King. This shed served as a Chapel for  three years up to the end of 1948.

As the accommodation in the Chapel was too? for the growing strength of the Catholics, efforts were
stated by the Church Committee to renovate the building. Approval was accorded by the then Chief Electrical Engineer, Janab M.Hayath, during his visit to Jog in the month of November 1948, for renovating the building, as it was required by rules. An appeal for funds, approved by His Lordship the Bishop of Mysore, was sent up all round. The Catholic workers of Jog, though poor, readily responded to the appeal by contributing their mite both by cash and free labour. The mound all around the Chapel was levelled by the voluntary labour of the Catholics, the cost of which was then estimated to about Rs. 1500/-. Then the mud walled Chapel was dismantled and the foundation for the Church was laid by His Lordship on 2 June 1948. The construction of the Church was entrusted to Government Contractor Sriyuths V. Lakkanna and Krishna lyengar, who did the work on most economic and concessional rates, and the work was completed by the end of 1949. During the construction of the Church, Mass was being said in Mr. D'Sa's Bungalow. The total cost of the building excluding free labour (free labour was estimated at about Rs. 2000/-) was about Rs.2500/- In the efforts were continued for collecting funds, both for the construction and maintenance of the Church. and Mr. & Mrs. D’Sa along with the Committee members, paid personal interest in collecting funds both from and outside Jog. Mr. D’Sa took keen interest in collecting funds even from Mangalore and other places, Mr. J.L.D’Sa was in direct management of Church affairs, as the President of the Catholic Association, from the year 1945 to 1955 November, when he was transferred to Bangalore on promotion as the Chief Electrical Engineer. The Catholics of Jog gave grand party to D'Sa family, on the eve of the Parish Feast on 7 November 1955. The distinguished guests who graced the occasion were, Sri H.V.Narayana Rao, General Superintendent Jog (Presided),Rev. Father Aug F D'Souza, Parish Priest, Sagar, Father Joseph D’Souza, Parish Priest, Shimoga, Father AFernandes, Parish Priest, Hosanagar. A beautiful Picture of Christ the King, mounted in pure silver frame Was presented to D'Sa family, as token of love and gratitude from the Catholics of Jog. A farewell address both in English and Kannada was read on the occasion, at which Mr. D'Sa was requested to continue his patronage over the Catholic Community of Jog, by continuing to be the President (in absentia) of the Association. The following are some of the important works carried out by the Church Committee, during the direct management of Mr.D'Sa:
l . Purchasing of the Shed and converting the same into a Chapel during the year 1945-46, at a total cost of about Rs. 1500\-
2. The Church was renovated during the year 1948—49. at a total cost of about Rs.4000/excluding free labour.
3. A Grotto in front of the Church. dedicated to our lady of Lourdes, was built during January 1953 by the voluntary labour of the Catholics.
4.A Teak-Wood vesty Box was manufactured during January 1954 for which the wood was donated by Mr. D’ Sa, and Rs.25/- was paid to one Carpenter. Sri Krishna. as an honorarium and not as labour charges, since the actual labour charges of the Box was estimated to about Rs.50/-. The box is being used for preserving Mass vestments and other Altar Linen.
5.Five sets of Mass vestments, one Monstrance, one Chalice and one Ciborium, Altar Stone, Altar Cross, Brass Candle Sticks. One White Copa, Humaral Veil and other mass requirements, were purchased during the years 1950 and 1953, at a total of about Rs. 1000. Also a big Carpet was bought at  Rs.53/- during the year 1954.
6.	Yearly visits of Our Lady of Fatima to Catholic homes, commenced from October 1952.
This devotion was continued every year up to 1957. and had to be stopped temporarily due to some Quarrels started in Kargal during the devotion, which took a very serious turn. This practice was subsequently continued.
7.Annual celebration of the titular Feast of Christ the King, the patron of the Parish was introduced from the year 1952, and ever since is being celebrated.
 
preceded by a Triduum. The charge of inviting. Priests for the Feast was vested on the Chaplain and usually three to four priests used to the occasion. There was no definite date for the celebration of the Feast, up to 1954, The Committee felt that the Annual fest should be celebrated somewhere within a fortnight of the actual Feast of Christ the King, which falls on last Sunday in November. Also a convenient day was sought for to enable all the Catholic Workers of log to partake in the celebration. Hence Second Tuesday in November (Tuesday was chosen, because it is the weekly holiday for the Project), chosen for the celebration of the Titular Feast of the Parish every year, and this was unanimously approved by the Catholic Public, at their Annual
General Body Meeting held on 2 1 March 1955. From thence the celebration of the Feast took place on the following dates: 8 November 1955; 13 November 1956; 5 November 1957; and 11 November 1958. The Charge of the Church affairs was handed over by Mr. D'Sa to Mr. William P. Douglas, who was nominated as Vice President, and to act as President, during the absence of Mr. D'Sa, who was continued as the President of the Catholic Association. He looked upon the management of the church affairs up to January 1959.

At a General Body meeting of the Catholics, held on 30 November 1956, the rate of monthly subscription was raised from 4 annas to 8 annas, for every earning member. It was also decided a this meeting that no other subscription would be levied during the year, after this raise in monthly subscription, except on very rare occasions, such as Bishop's visits or any other extraordinary functions.
Father Patrick Saldhana was appointed during the year  1 952, as an assistant to Father Augustine E D'Souza. Parish Priest, Sagar, to assist him in visiting the sub Stations and especially Jog.Fr Saldhana was to visit Jog every fortnight, with his headquarters at Sagar. Father DSouza made an appeal to the Church Committee, for financial help, for providing accommodation at his Presbytery, for his Assistant, who was solely meant for Jog. A sum of Rs. 200/- was donated for the above purpose to Father D'Souza, on 4 February 1952. Father Saldhana was in charge of this parish, as Assistant to Parish Priest, from 1952 to July 1955, until he was transferred to Gadanalli. The Church was originally provided with only one verandah on the western side, on which a room was built, which served as the presbytery for the visiting priests. The eastern side of the Church was exposed to winds and rain, and it was felt quite urgent to provide a verandah on that side, which would serve both as additional accommodation as well as a support to walls. The proposal was placed before the Church Committee, and it was unanimously resolved on 30-9-1956, to put up a verandah on the eastern side of the Church, and to provide a room, similar to the one existing on the western side. A special contribution was raised among the Catholics, and about Rs. 100/- was collected for the purpose.
 
The work was taken up and finished during the months of February and March 1967, at a total cost of about Rs 400/- All these years (i.e. from 1949 to 1 957 end), the Priest who used to pay fortnightly visits to Jog, was halting in the room provided on the western verandah of the Church. Efforts for building a decent presbytery for the Priest started from the year 1955, and through a resolution of the General Body of the Catholics, the Department of Electricity was requested for the grant of a site by the side of the Church, for constructing a Presbytery. After continuous correspondence, a site measuring 5OX 50 for the purpose was sanctioned by Government, vide their G.O.N0., PWD-6-HCW: 57, dated Bangalore, 17 July 1957, on a LEASE BASIS, for a period of thirty years from the date of Order, on an annual ground rent of R.s.5/-. The Lease Bond with site plan etc. was Registered on 10 February 1961. As per the above Lease Bond, period begins from July 1957 and ends in July 1987, after which the Mission will either have to dismantle the building or further extend the lease period. by renewing the Lease Bond. An estimate amounting to Rs. 5764/- along with the plan for the proposed Presbytery, was submitted to his lordship. the Bishop. through the Parish Priest. during January 1956. Also an appeal was made to His Lordship for funds. The estimate with the plan was received back with the approval of the Bishop, with assurance of help. Accordingly, the foundation stone for the building was blessed and laid by Rev. Fr A.F DSouza on 26 February 1957. and immediately thereafter the work was taken up. When the construction of the building reached roof level, the Committee ran almost out of funds. and appeal for funds was renewed with His Lordship, through the P.P., on 30 March 1957. For a grant of Rs.2500/- His Lordship during his visit to Jog in the month of February 1958, was pleased to observe the progress made in the construction of the Presbytery, and was convinced that the work was held up for want of funds. As such and in response to our appeal, a sum of Rs. 1300/- was donated by His Lordship. through the Parish Priest. which reached the Committee at a most critical moment, when the Committee had completely run out of funds, and was anxious to complete the roofing and other works. before the starting of monsoon. At last the entire work was completed by the end of December 1958, at a total cost of about Rs.4000/-. excluding free labour by the parishioners. The Presbytery  was furnished with a new set of furniture. got done at Mysore, consisting of Rose wood chairs. one Ratan chair. and also two tables and two cots. and one easy chair. donated by Sri. W.P. Douglas 
 
W.P. Douglas, who was put in charge of church affairs after transfer of Sri in direct supervision of the construction of the presbytery. and the entire credit for speedy  and  economic construction of the building will have to go to him. Mr Douglas retired from service and hence had to leave Jog during January 1959 In appreciation for the valuable service rendered by Sri Douglas to the Church and Catholic Community. A gold ring worth one sovereign was presented to him through father D'Souza  After the departure of Sri Douglas, the charge of the Church affairs was vested on Sri Jos. F.C. Sequeira, the Secretary of the association. until the posting of the permanent Priest. Father James Rao, who took charge of the Parish on 13 June 1959.
The next important work undertaken was, the starting of the Legion of Mary in the Parish.  Absence of a good and organised association was felt as an immediate need for the Parish, to assist the Parish Priest in his day to day parish work, and to carry on the Lay Apostolate in the Parish. As such thirteen enthusiastic men were chosen to start the Legion, and the first meeting was held on 30 August 1960. Election of office Bearers was conducted. during the meeting, and Br.Jos.F.C. Secuueira was elected as the president, Br.S.C. Fernandes as the Vice President, Br. Thomas D'Costa as the Secretary, and Br. Hilorin Dias as the Treasurer, for the year 1960-61. Tuesday 27 September 1960 was chosen for the inauguration of the Legion, and President of Shimoga Curia was invited to inaugurate the Legion. The Legion is dedicated to the maternal care of Our Lady of Perpetual Succour, and is named after her. Official inauguration of the Legion of Our Lady of Perpetual Succour, was held accordingly on 27 September 1960, by Br.A.Doraiswamy, the Curia President, and thirteen Legionaries took their Oath of Allegiance, before the Curia President, and the Spiritual Director Rev. Father James Rao, Parish Priest. Since then regular weekly meetings are being conducted, and the legion has become a great source of help to the Parish.
On the arrival of the permanent Parish Priest
 
to Jog, the Church Committee was abolished, and the entire charge of the Church affairs was handed over to him, through  Father A.F Dsouza. thus after fourteen years of management of the Church affairs, which was an extraordinary privilege enjoyed by the laity of Jog. the Church Committee on handing over charge to the Parish Priest, thanked their Patron Christ the King.  for all the graces and help bestowed upon them during their term of
 
stewardship. Just a month prior to coming of the Permanent Parish Priest, His Lordship was pleased to pay a visit to Jog, with His Auxiliary Bishop Abert D'Souza, when the Catholics of Jog, presented to them an address and had renewed their prayer for sending a permanent priest to Jog. His Lordship had promised to send one early, and within a month after His Lordship's visit, Jog Parish was blessed with a Permanent Parish Priest.

Festivities
It celebrated its golden jubilee in 2009.
The church feast is celebrated on 2nd Tuesday of November.

Mass timings
Sunday- 7AM, 9AM
Monday-7 AM
Tuesday-7 AM
Wednesday-7 AM (Convent)
Thursday-6 PM
Friday-6 PM
Saturday-5 PM

Bishop Francis Serrao had his official Pastoral visit to Christ the King Church, Jog Falls on 12 and 13 December 2015. Bishop was cordially and warmly welcomed by the Parish Priest Fr. Stephen Albuquerque and the parishioners. On Saturday, 12th evening there was special prayers service in the Parish especially for all the departed souls of the parish.
 
On Sunday, 13th morning Bishop celebrated solemn Holy Eucharist. Before the Mass he catechized the children and the adults on the sacrament of Confirmation and During the Holy Eucharist bishop administrated the Sacrament of Confirmation to children of the parish. Bishop in his homily said, we need to learn the language of Jesus. The language of Jesus is love, compassion, forgiveness, generosity. The Sacrament of Confirmation strengths all to deepen our faith and gives grace to learn the language of Jesus. 
 
After the Holy Mass, the parish priest and parishioners honoured bishop in the name of entire Parish. During his address to the entire assembly of Parishioners the Bishop exhorted the parish community about the importance of the family life, daily family prayer, parents role in nurturing and guiding their specially teen-children and the importance of the spiritual life. He also pointed out the importance and role of Small Christian Communities in professing and proclaiming their faith by being true witnesses of the Gospel. The Bishop emphasized on providing opportunities to our youth for higher education and professional training. Bishop appreciated the parish community for their vibrate participation in the liturgy and active involvement in the parish activities.    
 
During the pastoral visit the Bishop personally met the Parish Pastoral Council members, Parish Finance committee members, Women Association, YCS Children, Children group and Altar Servers.  He also visited the sick and gave Holy Communion to them.  There was festive climate throughout marked the event.

  Jog Falls is a well-known place in the world for the water falls. It attracts thousands of tourists and visitors from all corners of the world. Christ the King Church is located in the closest vicinity of this famous falls. People of all walk of life visits this famous Church as pilgrims as well as visitors to pray. The faithful of the parish have decided to erect an 18 feet high Statue of Christ the King in front of the Church. They are hopeful to finish the work in a year with the help of the donors. Most Rev. Dr Francis Serrao SJ the bishop of Shimoga blessed the site of the statue to be erected On 22 July 19 and prayed for the success of the project.

Priest in the service of Church
Rev. Fr. James Rao                 11-06-1959       to       29-05-1962
Rev. Fr. Joe Mary Lobo             29-05-1962       to       14-04-1966
Rev. Fr. K. A. Mathew              14-04-1966       to       13-05-1967
Rev. Fr. Anthony Dsouza            13-05-1967       to       09-05-1973
Rev. Fr. Valerian Lobo             09-05-1973       to       06-03-1977
Rev. Fr. Mark Dsilva               06-03-1977       to       11-03-1986
Rev. Fr. Walter Pinto              11-03-1986       to       12-06-1989
Rev. Fr. J. B. Castolino           12-06-1989       to       12-06-1994 
Rev. Fr. Paul Morras               12-06-1994       to       18-04-1999
Rev. Fr. Albert Gonsalves          18-04-1999       to        05-06-2006
Rev. Fr. Venus Praveen Colaco      05-06-2006       to        2012
Rev. Fr. Stephen Albuqure          2012             to        2018
Rev. Fr. Ronald Veiges             2018             to         present

The current parish priest is  Rev. Fr. Ronald Veiges
. There are 300 families and total strength of 1000 people.

References

External links
 Jogfalls Church information from Roman Catholic Diocese of Shimoga website

Roman Catholic churches in Karnataka
Buildings and structures in Shimoga district